Antonio Granata (born 20 January 1997) is an Italian football player. He plays for A.S.D. Nocerina 1910 in the Serie D.

Club career
He made his Serie C debut for Sicula Leonzio on 21 January 2018 in a game against Trapani.

He joined Serie D club SSCD Granata 1924 (also known as AV Erconalese) on 18 August 2018.

References

External links
 
 

1997 births
Footballers from Naples
Living people
Italian footballers
S.S.C. Napoli players
A.S.D. Sicula Leonzio players
A.S.D. Nocerina 1910 players
Serie C players
Serie D players
Association football defenders